The 1920–21 Northern Football League season was the 28th in the history of the Northern Football League, a football competition in Northern England.

Clubs

The league featured 12 clubs which competed in the last season, along with two new clubs:
 Tow Law Town
 Langley Park

League table

References

1920-21
1920–21 in English football leagues